The Byron R. Sherman House, also known as The Castle or The Castle of White Sulphur Springs, is a site on the National Register of Historic Places located in White Sulphur Springs, Montana, United States.  It was added to the Register on September 15, 1977. The property includes a carriage house.

The Castle Museum is operated by the Meagher County Historical Society. It includes period furniture, photos, mineral samples, clothing and artifacts from the region's past.

It is a two-story granite mansion upon an elevated basement on a hilltop overlooking the City of White Sulphur Springs. According to its NRHP nomination, "with its heavily rusticated stone (the back, or east facade is laid up in field stone), [it] is a very fine frontier rendition of the late 19th century Romanesque Style."

References

External links
 Castle Museum and Carriage House - Facebook site
 The Castle Museum - Central Montana

Houses in Meagher County, Montana
Houses on the National Register of Historic Places in Montana
Museums in Meagher County, Montana
Historic house museums in Montana
National Register of Historic Places in Meagher County, Montana
Romanesque Revival architecture in Montana
Houses completed in 1890
Castles in the United States
1890 establishments in Montana
Granite buildings